SV Grün-Weiß Lübben is a German football club based in Lübben (Spreewald), Brandenburg, currently playing in the Landesklasse Brandenburg-Süd (VIII).

History 
The forerunner of SV Grün-Weiß Lübben was founded in 1961 as Dynamo Lübben. Dynamo played two seasons in the DDR-Liga (II) and twice competed in the FDGB-Pokal.

The club made a short revival in the early 2000s when it won successive championships in the Landesklasse and Landesliga in 2006 and 2007 and earned promotion to the Brandenburg-Liga. It played at this level for five seasons, was relegated again in 2012 and promptly dropped back to the Landesklasse the season after. A Landesklasse championship in 2015 took the club back to the Landesliga.

Honours 
The club's honours:
 Landesliga Brandenburg-Süd
 Champions: 2007
 Landesklasse Brandenburg-Ost
 Champions: 2006
 Landesklasse Brandenburg-Mitte
 Champions: 2015
 Runners-up: 2005, 2014

Stadium 
SV Grün-Weiß Lübben plays its home fixtures at the 6,000 capacity Stadion der Völkerfreundschaft.

References

External links 
 SV Grün-Weiß Lübben 

Football clubs in Germany
Football clubs in Brandenburg
Football clubs in East Germany
Association football clubs established in 1991
1991 establishments in Germany